Robert Carr, 1st Earl of Somerset  (c. 158717 July 1645), was a politician, and favourite of King James VI and I.

Background

Robert Kerr was born in Wrington, Somerset, England, the younger son of Sir Thomas Kerr (Carr) of Ferniehurst, Scotland, by his second wife, Janet Scott, sister of Walter Scott of Buccleuch. About the year 1601, while an obscure page to Sir George Home, he met Thomas Overbury in Edinburgh. The two became friends and travelled to London together. Overbury soon became Carr's secretary. When Carr embarked on his career at court, Overbury became mentor, secretary, and political advisor to his more charismatic friend, the brain behind Carr's steady rise to prominence.

King's favourite

In 1607, Carr happened to break his leg at a tilting match, at which King James VI and I was in attendance. According to Thomas Howard, 1st Earl of Suffolk, the king taught him Latin. The king subsequently knighted the young Carr and took him into favour. Sir Walter Raleigh had, through his attainder, forfeited his life-interest in the manor of Sherborne, even though he had previously executed a conveyance by which the property was to pass on his death to his eldest son (a conveyance which helped to codify many aspects of the English use of primogeniture, still in practice even today). Unfortunately for Raleigh, this document was rendered worthless by a flaw that gave the king eventual possession of the property. Acting on the advice of Robert Cecil, 1st Earl of Salisbury, his Secretary of State, James conferred the manor on Carr. The case was argued at law, and in 1609 judgment was given for the Crown. Apparently Lady Raleigh received some inadequate compensation, and Carr at once entered on possession. Carr's influence became such that in 1610 he was instrumental in persuading the king to dissolve Parliament, which had shown signs of attacking the king's Scottish favourites. On 24 March 1611 he was created Viscount Rochester, and subsequently a Privy Councillor.

Marriage to Frances Howard

When Salisbury died in 1612, James had the notion of governing in person as his own chief Minister of State, with Carr carrying out many of Salisbury's former duties and acting as the king's secretary. But James' inability to attend closely to official business exposed the government to factionalism. The Howard party, consisting of Henry Howard, 1st Earl of Northampton; Thomas Howard, 1st Earl of Suffolk; his son-in-law William Knollys, 1st Earl of Banbury; Charles Howard, 1st Earl of Nottingham, and Sir Thomas Lake, soon took control of much of the government and its patronage. Even the powerful Carr, hardly experienced for the responsibilities thrust upon him and often dependent on his intimate friend Overbury for assistance with government papers, fell into the Howard camp. He had done this after beginning an affair with Frances Howard, Countess of Essex, daughter of the Earl of Suffolk.

Overbury mistrusted the Howards and still had Carr's ear, and tried to prevent the marriage. In order to remove him from court, the Howard faction manipulated Overbury into seeming to be disrespectful to the queen. They then persuaded the king to offer Overbury an assignment as ambassador to the court of Tsar Michael of Russia, aware that his refusal would be tantamount to treason. The plan worked and Overbury declined, wishing to remain in England and at his friend's side. On 22 April 1613 Overbury was placed in the Tower of London at the king's "request", eventually dying there five months later on 15 September "of natural causes".

On 25 September 1613, and supported by the king, Lady Essex obtained a decree of nullity of marriage against her husband, Robert Devereux, 3rd Earl of Essex. On 3 November 1613 Carr was advanced to the Earldom of Somerset, on 23 December appointed Treasurer of Scotland. On 26 December, Lady Essex married Carr.

Power, scandal, and downfall
In 1614 Carr was appointed Lord Chamberlain. He supported the earl of Northampton and the Spanish party in opposition to the old tried advisers of the king, such as the Lord Chancellor Ellesmere, who were endeavouring to maintain the union with the Protestants abroad. As the years progressed James showered Somerset with more gifts, until 1615 when the two men had a falling out and Somerset was replaced by George Villiers (whom James made Duke of Buckingham). James wrote a letter that year detailing a list of complaints he then had against Somerset. Somerset still retained some favour, and might possibly have remained in power for some time longer but for the discovery in July of the murder of Overbury by poisoning. At the infamous trial Edward Coke and Francis Bacon were set to unravel the plot.

Eventually, four people had been convicted for taking part in the murder, and hanged at Tyburn at the end of 1615. They were Sir Gervase Helwys, Lieutenant of the Tower of London, Richard Weston, a gaoler, Mrs Anne Turner, a "waiting woman" of Frances Howard, and an apothecary called Franklin. Sir Thomas Monson, 1st Baronet was also implicated in the case, but the charges against him were later dropped.

Somerset and Howard were brought to trial in the spring of 1616. The latter confessed, and her guilt is widely accepted. Somerset's share is far more difficult to uncover, and probably will never be fully known. The evidence against him rested on mere presumption, and he consistently declared himself innocent. Probabilities are on the whole in favour of the hypothesis that he was no more than an accessory after the fact.

Fearing Somerset might seek to implicate him, James repeatedly sent messages to the Tower pleading with him to admit his guilt in return for a pardon stating, "It is easy to be seen that he would threaten me with laying an aspersion upon me of being, in some sort, accessory to his crime".

The king eventually let matters take their course, and both Somerset and Howard were found guilty and confined to the Tower. The sentence, however, was not carried into effect against either culprit. Howard was pardoned immediately, but both remained in the Tower until 1622. Somerset appears to have refused to buy forgiveness by concessions, and did not obtain his pardon until 1624.

He emerged into public view only once more when, in 1630, he was prosecuted in the Star Chamber for communicating a paper recommending the establishment of arbitrary government by Robert Dudley to John Holles, 1st Earl of Clare.

Somerset died in July 1645, leaving one daughter, Anne, the sole issue of his ill-fated marriage, afterwards wife of William Russell, 1st Duke of Bedford.

In popular culture
The rise and fall of Robert Carr and his relationship to Thomas Overbury are the subject of Rafael Sabatini's 1930 novel The Minion, written shortly before Sabatini's divorce from his first wife in 1931. (Given The Minions more tragic tone, it may have been Sabatini's divorce that tainted his normally optimistic, hero-wins-out writing style.)

References

Further reading
 
 
 
 Gardiner, 
 
  argues the case for Carr's innocence.

External links
The Overbury Murder Scandal (1615-1616) earlystuartlibels.net

English courtiers
1580s births
1645 deaths
British and English royal favourites
Scottish royal favourites
Knights of the Garter
Lord-Lieutenants of Durham
Lords Privy Seal
Lords Warden of the Cinque Ports
Members of the Privy Council of England
Carr, Robert
People from Wrington
Treasurers of Scotland
16th-century English nobility
17th-century English nobility
Earls of Somerset
Court of James VI and I